The Cariboo Trail is a 1950 American Western film directed by Edwin L. Marin and starring Randolph Scott.

It was the final film appearance of George "Gabby" Hayes.

Plot
Montanans Jim Redfern and Mike Evans head into Canada's British Columbia via the Cariboo Trail intent on raising cattle and digging for gold but find trouble instead.

Cast
 Randolph Scott as Jim Redfern
 George "Gabby" Hayes as Oscar aka Grizzly 
 Bill Williams as Mike Evans 
 Karin Booth as Frances Harrison
 Victor Jory as Frank Walsh
 Douglas Kennedy as Murphy
 Jim Davis as Bill Miller
 Dale Robertson as Will Gray
 Mary Stuart as Jane Winters
 James Griffith as Higgins 
 Lee Tung Foo as Ling
 Tony Hughes as Dr. John S. Rhodes
 Mary Kent as Mrs. Martha Winters
 Ray Hyke as Jones
 Jerry Root as Jenkins
 Cliff Clark as Assayer
 Tom Monroe as Bartender
 Fred Libby as Chief White Buffalo 
 'Kansas' Moehring as Stage Driver
 Dorothy Adams as Nurse
 Michael Barrett as Hotel Clerk

References

External links

1950 films
Films directed by Edwin L. Marin
1950 Western (genre) films
American Western (genre) films
Cinecolor films
20th Century Fox films
Films scored by Paul Sawtell
1950s English-language films
1950s American films